Jacques I may also refer to:
 Jacques I, Emperor of Haiti (1758–1806), the Emperor of Haiti
 Jacques I, Prince of Monaco (1689–1751), the Prince of Monaco
 Jacques I of Cyprus (1334–1398), the Regent of Cyprus
 Jaime, Duke of Madrid (1870–1931), the Duke of Madrid
 Jacques I, Emperor of the Sahara 1903, self-proclaimed Emperor of the Sahara